Omar Abdul Thomas (born February 27, 1982) is an American former professional basketball player.

Early years
Thomas was born in Philadelphia.

Having taken the first steps to Strawberry Mansion High School and at Panola Junior College (Texas), passes to the prestigious University of Texas El Paso (UTEP), taking leave in 2005 with figures of all respect.

Professional career
After the university, Thomas had a tryout with the Seattle SuperSonics but did not sign contract. Then he went to the Coca-Cola Tigers in the Philippines. After one year he went to the NBA Development League (NBDL) with the Austin Toros. His career continued in the Dominican Republic with the Deportivo Naco.

In 2006, he was spotted by Giampiero Ticchi who brought him to play in Italy where his first team was Rimini where he played for two seasons. During the summer of 2008, he signed an agreement with the French club Pau-Orthez, but was cut after three games. Then he went back in Italy and signed with Napoli, which debuted in Serie A. At Napoli he averaged 11.5 points and 5.7 rebounds per game. In July 2009, he signed with Brindisi of the Legadue Basket. At the end of the season, he was named the Legadue MVP.

On June 24, 2010, Thomas signed with Sidigas Avellino. In the 2010–11 season, Thomas drag the club in playoff with the fourth place overall at the end of the regular season, and won the title of MVP of the Italian League regular season, with an average of 18.0 points and 6.2 rebounds.

On 6 December 2011, the National Commission of Judges of the FIP has suspended the player for 16 months (until April 6, 2013) because he was charged with possession of false passports of Republic of Slovenia. However a few days later the player had the permission from FIBA to move to Crvena zvezda, as the disqualification of the Italian federation had no international effect. While playing with Crvena zvezda he had a good season, leading his team to the final of the playoffs in the Serbian League and the final of Kup Radivoja Koraća where they lost both times to Partizan.

On July 12, 2013, Thomas signed with Dinamo Sassari for the 2013–14 season. On August 23, 2014, he signed with FMC Ferentino of the Italian Serie A2 Basket for the 2014–15 season.

In November 2015, he signed with Halcones Rojos Veracruz of the Mexican LNBP. In late December 2015, he left Veracruz and signed with VITA Tbilisi of the VTB United League. On March 1, 2016, he left Tbilisi and signed with Zenit Saint Petersburg for the rest of the season.

On July 3, 2016, Thomas signed with Vanoli Cremona for the 2016–17 season. On November 23, 2016, he parted ways with Cremona after appearing in six games. In December 2016, he signed with Hoops Club. In 2017, he played in Mexico with the Náuticos de Mazatlán of the Circuito de Baloncesto de la Costa del Pacífico (CIBACOPA).

References

External links 
Eurobasket.com profile
Italian League profile 
FIBA.com profile

1982 births
Living people
ABA League players
African-American basketball players
American expatriate basketball people in France
American expatriate basketball people in Georgia (country)
American expatriate basketball people in Italy
American expatriate basketball people in Lebanon
American expatriate basketball people in Mexico
American expatriate basketball people in Russia
American expatriate basketball people in Serbia
American expatriate basketball people in the Philippines
American men's basketball players
Basket Ferentino players
Basket Rimini Crabs players
Basketball players from Philadelphia
BC Krasnye Krylia players
BC Zenit Saint Petersburg players
Dinamo Sassari players
Élan Béarnais players
Halcones Rojos Veracruz players
Junior college men's basketball players in the United States
KK Crvena zvezda players
Lega Basket Serie A players
New Basket Brindisi players
Nuova AMG Sebastiani Basket Rieti players
Powerade Tigers players
S.S. Felice Scandone players
Shooting guards
Small forwards
UTEP Miners men's basketball players
Vanoli Cremona players
Venados de Mazatlán (basketball) players
21st-century African-American sportspeople
20th-century African-American people